The South-Eastern Chord, abbreviated as ЮВХ, is an expressway under construction in Moscow. The South-East Chord will be connected with the North-East Chord and the Southern Rocade, as well as with the Third Ring Road in the area of Novokhokhlovskaya railway station of the Kursky line of the Moscow Railway. It will be located in the South-Eastern, Southern and partially Eastern Administrative Okrugs of Moscow.

References 

Roads in Moscow